Wil Tirion (born February 19, 1943) is a Dutch uranographer (celestial cartographer). His most famous work, Sky Atlas 2000.0, is renowned by astronomers for its accuracy and beauty. The second edition of his most complete work, Uranometria 2000.0, was published in 2001 by Willmann-Bell. He is also responsible for the sky charts found in many other publications. He was originally a graphic designer. The minor planet (asteroid) 4648 Tirion is named after him.

Works

Notes

External links
Wil Tirion's website

1943 births
Living people
20th-century cartographers
21st-century cartographers